Petherton is part of the name of two places in Somerset, England:

North Petherton, town in Sedgemoor
South Petherton, village in South Somerset

See also
Baron Harding of Petherton, title in the Peerage of the United Kingdom